The July Putsch was a failed coup attempt against the Austrofascist regime by Austrian Nazis from 25 to 30 July 1934.

Just a few months after the Austrian Civil War, Austrian Nazis and German SS soldiers attacked the Chancellery in Vienna in an attempt to depose the ruling Fatherland Front government under Engelbert Dollfuss in favor of replacing it with a pro-Nazi government under Anton Rintelen of the Christian Social Party. The Nazi putsch ultimately failed as the majority of the Austrian population and army remained loyal to the government. The Nazis managed to kill Dollfuss, but Kurt Schuschnigg succeeded him and the Austrofascist regime remained in power.

A German invasion of Austria in support of the putsch was averted because of the guarantee of independence and diplomatic support that Austria received from Fascist Italy.

Background 
The Nazi Machtergreifung in Germany on 30 January 1933, when President Paul von Hindenburg appointed Adolf Hitler chancellor, gave an enormous boost to Austrian Nazis. When the Austrian chancellor Engelbert Dollfuss obstructed further sessions of the National Council parliament on 4 March 1933, the Austrian Nazis responded with demands for a new election, massive propaganda and a wave of bomb terror. Dollfuss responded to the actions with authoritarian measures such as house searches and arrests. The situation was exacerbated by the Bavarian Minister of Justice, the Nazi lawyer Hans Frank, who, in a public speech on 8 March, threatened the Austrian government with an armed intervention by Nazi forces. Nevertheless, the right-wing Austrian government initially concentrated on the ban of the Communist Party and the Social Democratic Republikanischer Schutzbund paramilitary organisation. When Hans Frank, together with his party fellows Hanns Kerrl and Roland Freisler, on 13 May 1933, personally entered the country to speak in Vienna (where he behaved himself) as well as Graz (where he openly spoke against the regime and addressed Austrian Germans encouraging civic disobedience), after a two-day tour, on 15 May 1933, he was allegedly deported and the Austrian Nazi Party banned on 19 June 1933. Many Austrian Nazis fled to Germany and joined the Austrian Legion, and others remained in Austria and continued their actions illegally. Hitler's government reacted with harsh economic sanctions aimed at Austrian tourism.

Events 
On 25 July 1934, in the midst of difficult social and political tensions, and with the knowledge of official German positions, 154 SS men disguised as Bundesheer soldiers and policemen pushed into the Austrian chancellery. Dollfuss was killed by two bullets fired by Nazi Otto Planetta. The rest of the government was able to escape. Another group of the putschists occupied the RAVAG radio building and broadcast a false report about the putative transfer of power from Dollfuss to Anton Rintelen, which was to have been the call for Nazis all over Austria to begin the uprising against the state. There were several days of fighting in parts of Carinthia, Styria and Upper Austria as well as smaller uprisings in Salzburg. There was fighting in Upper Styria, both the industrial area between Judenburg and Leoben and in Enns, the Deutschlandsberg District in southwestern Styria and in southeastern Styria by Bad Radkersburg. Bloody clashes took place in and around Schladming and Leoben.

In Carinthia, the centres of the coup were in Lower Carinthia and Sankt Paul im Lavanttal. In Upper Austria, in addition to individual actions in the Salzkammergut, the fighting was concentrated in the Pyhrn Pass and in the Mühlviertel, where on the night of 26 July, in the Kollerschlag area on the Bavarian-Austrian border, a division of the Austrian Legion invaded Austrian territory and attacked the customs guard and a police station.

The Austrian Nazis were not armed since they had believed that the Austrian military and police would join them once the coup began, but most forces stayed loyal.

Early on 26 July, a German courier was arrested at the border crossing in Kollerschlag who was carrying precise instructions for the putsch. Called the "Kollerschlag Document", it testified to a clear connection between Bavaria and the July Putsch.

The death of Dollfuss enraged Mussolini, whose wife Rachele was entertaining the rest of Dolfuss' family, and led to his decision to move troops to the Austrian border and tell Hitler that he was not to invade Austria. This made Hitler proclaim that he did not support the coup, which ultimately led to its failure.

Aftermath 
The coup was finally crushed by the police, military and paramilitary units loyal to the government. There is varying information regarding the number of fatalities. Gerhard Jagschitz took over the work of military historian Erwin Steinböck. In 1965 his figures claimed that the July coup and its immediate consequences lead to the deaths of 270 people:  153 Nazi supporters died (including 13 executed and seven people who committed suicide), 104 died on the Government side, along with 13 civilians. In contrast, Austrian historian Kurt Bauer's extensive studies concluded that there were 223 deaths: 111 Nazi supporters, 101 on the Government side, and 11 civilians. The number of injured is estimated at 500–600 people.

On 26 July 1934 military tribunals took place to prosecute rebels. 13 were executed and 4,000 Nazi supporters were detained. Many fled to Yugoslavia or to Germany. Kurt von Schuschnigg became the new Chancellor and Ernst Rüdiger Starhemberg remained as Vice-Chancellor.

After the failed putsch, Hitler closed down the Munich office of the Austrian Nazi Party.

See also 
Austria in the time of National Socialism
Austrian Civil War

References

Notes

Bibliography

Statistics regarding people affected
Beiträge zur Vorgeschichte und Geschichte der Julirevolte. Published using official sources, Vienna 1934 
Die Erhebung der österreichischen Nationalsozialisten im Juli 1934. Akten der Historischen Kommission des Reichsführers SS. Compiled by Herbert Steiner, Europa Press, Vienna-Frankfurt/Zurich 1965 (new edition 1984) 
Die Juli-Revolte 1934. Das Eingreifen des österreichischen Bundesheeres zu ihrer Niederwerfung. Only for internal use. Printed by the Federal Ministry of Defence as a manuscript, Vienna 1936

Overviews
Bauer, Kurt: Elementar-Ereignis. Die österreichischen Nationalsozialisten und der Juliputsch 1934, Czernin Verlag, Vienna 2003,  
Etschmann, Wolfgang: Die Kämpfe in Österreich im Juli 1934 (Military History Series, No. 50) Austrian Federal Publisher, Vienna 1984 
Jagschitz, Gerhard: Der Putsch. Die Nationalsozialisten 1934 in Österreich, Verlag Styria, Graz-Vienna-Cologne 1976,  
Kindermann, Gottfried-Karl: Hitlers Niederlage in Österreich. Bewaffneter NS-Putsch, Kanzlermord und Österreichs Abwehrsieg von 1934, 1st Edition, Hoffmann und Campe, Hamburg 1984,  
Schafranek, Hans: Sommerfest mit Preisschießen. Die unbekannte Geschichte des NS-Putsches im Juli 1934, Czernin Verlag, Vienna 2006,

Studies and essays on regions affected
Klösch, Christian: Des Führers heimliche Vasallen. Die Putschisten des Juli 1934 im Kärntner Lavanttal, Czernin Verlag, Vienna 2007,  
Maislinger, Andreas: Der Putsch von Lamprechtshausen. Zeugen des Juli 1934 berichten, Self-publishing, Innsbruck 1992 
Staudinger, Eduard G.: Der Juli-Putsch 1934 im Bezirk Weiz. In: Journal 'Gleisdorf' 6, 1984, Edition no. 239-248 
Wolf, Gerald M.: "Jetzt sind wir die Herren ..." Die NSDAP im Bezirk Deutschlandsberg und der Juli-Putsch 1934 (Grazer Contemporary Studies, Volume 3) Innsbruck-Vienna-Bozen 2008,

External links 
Austria-Forum: Juliputsch 1934 
Juliputsch im Dokumentationsarchiv des österreichischen Widerstands 
Ermordung von Engelbert Dollfuß in der österreichischen Presse Österreichische Nationalbibliothek 
Juliputsch 1934: Lavanttaler Nazis am "erfolgreichsten" ORF-Science 

Nazism
1934 in Austria
Political history of Austria
Conflicts in 1934
Military history of Austria
1930s coups d'état and coup attempts
Fascist revolts
Austria–Germany military relations